Wandowo may refer to the following places:
Wandowo, Greater Poland Voivodeship (west-central Poland)
Wandowo, Kuyavian-Pomeranian Voivodeship (north-central Poland)
Wandowo, Chojnice County in Pomeranian Voivodeship (north Poland)
Wandowo, Kwidzyn County in Pomeranian Voivodeship (north Poland)